"Jukebox Junkie" is a song co-written and recorded by American country music artist Ken Mellons.  It was released in July 1994 as the second single from his debut album Ken Mellons. The song reached number 8 on the Billboard Hot Country Singles & Tracks chart and peaked at number 6 on the Canadian RPM Country Tracks chart.  It was written by Mellons, Jerry Cupit and Janice Honeycutt.

Content
The song is an uptempo, in which the narrator talks about how he loves to listen to the jukebox.

Critical reception
Deborah Evans Price, of Billboard magazine gave the song a mixed review, saying that while Mellons "possesses one of those deep, whiskey-soaked voice that could never be mistaken for anything but country", the song will likely "never be mistaken for anything other than what it is - a hopeless string of honky-tonk cliches."

Music video 
The music video was directed by Marc Ball and premiered in mid-1994.

Chart performance
"Jukebox Junkie" debuted at number sixty nine on the U.S. Billboard Hot Country Singles & Tracks for the week of July 30, 1994.

Year-end charts

References

Songs about country music
Songs about jukeboxes
1994 singles
1994 songs
Ken Mellons songs
Epic Records singles